Whitehall is an unincorporated community in Clay Township, Owen County, in the U.S. state of Indiana.

History
Whitehall was laid out in 1838 by James Brown, and named after a town in his native state of North Carolina. A post office was established at Whitehall in 1848, and remained in operation until it was discontinued in 1907.

Geography

References

Unincorporated communities in Indiana
Unincorporated communities in Owen County, Indiana